Events from the year 1929 in art.

Events
 January 6 – On the death of New York collector Louisine Havemeyer, her collection of paintings, rich in works of Impressionism, is bequeathed to the Metropolitan Museum of Art.
 January 10 – First appearance of Hergé's Belgian comic book hero Tintin as Tintin in the Land of the Soviets (Les Aventures de Tintin, reporter..., au pays des Soviets), begins serialization in children's newspaper supplement Le Petit Vingtième.
 January 17 – First appearance of E. C. Segar's American sailor comic book hero Popeye in Thimble Theatre.
 April 30 – English painters Stephen Bone and Mary Adshead marry.
 June 6 – Première of the Surrealist film Un Chien Andalou by Luis Buñuel and Salvador Dalí, in Paris.
 July 5 – In London, Scotland Yard seizes 13 paintings of male and female nudes by D. H. Lawrence from a Mayfair gallery on grounds of indecency under the Vagrancy Act 1838.
 August 21 – Mexican painters Diego Rivera and Frieda Kahlo marry for the first time, in a civil ceremony in the town hall at Coyoacán.
 October
 La galerie Goemans opens in Paris with a Surrealist exhibition featuring Jean Arp, Salvador Dalí, Yves Tanguy and René Magritte.
 American artist Lynd Ward publishes his first wordless "novel in woodcuts", Gods' Man, in New York City.
 October 12 – Joan Miró marries Pilar Juncosa in Palma, Mallorca.
 November – The East London Group (for the first time under this name) exhibit with Walter Sickert at the Lefevre Gallery in the West End of London.
 November 7 – The Museum of Modern Art opens in New York City. An exhibit, "Cézanne, Gauguin, Seurat and van Gogh", at the new museum attracts 47,000 visitors.
 December 1 – Underground Electric Railways Company of London officially opens its new headquarters building at 55 Broadway designed by Charles Holden, incorporating sculptures by Jacob Epstein, Eric Gill and Henry Moore.
 Aeropittura ("aeropainting") is launched in a manifesto, Perspectives of Flight, signed by Benedetta Cappa, Fortunato Depero, Gerardo Dottori, Fillìa, Filippo Tommaso Marinetti, Enrico Prampolini, Mino Somenzi and Guglielmo Sansoni (Tato) in Italy.
 Cercle et Carré group of abstract artists founded in Paris by Joaquín Torres García and Michel Seuphor.
 The Barcelona chair is designed by Ludwig Mies van der Rohe.
 Henri Matisse makes more than 300 (chine-collé) etchings and lithographs, chiefly of Lisette Löwengard.
 Musashino Art University originates as the Teikoku Bijutsu Gakkō ("Imperial Art School") in Tokyo.
 Curtis Moffat opens a gallery at 4 Fitzroy Square in London.
 Karl Blossfeldt publishes a collection of close-up photographs of plants and living things as Urformen der Kunst: Photographische Pflanzenbilder in Berlin.

Awards
 Archibald Prize: John Longstaff – W A Holman, KC
 Laura Knight made a Dame Commander of the Order of the British Empire

Works

 David Bomberg – Toledo from the Alcazar
 Emily Carr – The Indian Church
 Salvador Dalí
 The Great Masturbator
 The Lugubrious Game
 Guan Zilan – Portrait of Miss L
 Edward Hopper – Chop Suey
 Frieda Kahlo – The Bus
 Kawamura Kiyoo – Founding of the Nation (建国, Kenkoku, Le coq blanc)
 Harue Koga - The Sea
 Tamara de Lempicka – Autoportrait (Tamara in a Green Bugatti)
 René Magritte
 On the Threshold of Liberty (first version)
 The Treachery of Images
 Jeanne Mammen – Boring Dolls (watercolor)
 Carl Milles – The Sun Singer (bronze)
 Henry Moore – Reclining Figure (sculpture, Leeds Art Gallery)
 George Pitt Morison – The Foundation of Perth 1829
 Francis Picabia – Hera
 Pablo Picasso – Nude in an Armchair (Musée Picasso, Paris)
 Louis Frederick Roslyn – Bronze reliefs on Rawtenstall Cenotaph (England)
 Stanley Spencer – The Resurrection of the Soldiers (Sandham Memorial Chapel)
 Helen Torr – Houses on a Barge
 Julio Romero de Torres – La Fuensanta
 Doris Zinkeisen – Mrs Grahame Johnstone (self-portrait)

Births

January to June
 2 January – Anton Lehmden, Slovakian-born Austrian painter, co-founder of the Vienna School of Fantastic Realism (d. 2018)
 8 January – Poul Kjærholm, Danish designer (d. 1980)
 13 January – Roy Oxlade, English painter and critic (d. 2014)
 26 January – Jules Feiffer, American cartoonist
 28 January – Claes Oldenburg, Swedish-born American sculptor (d. 2022)
 9 February – Clement Meadmore Australian-born American sculptor (d. 2005)
 24 February – Zdzisław Beksiński, Polish painter, photographer and fantasy artist (d. 2005)
 4 March – Wolfgang Hollegha, Austrian painter
 22 March – Yayoi Kusama, Japanese visual artist.
 31 March
 Liz Claiborne, Belgian-born American fashion designer and entrepreneur (d. 2007)
 Jay DeFeo, American visual artist (d. 1989)
 5 April – Hugo Claus, Belgian novelist, poet, playwright, painter and film director (d. 2008)
 7 April – Gabriel Caruana, Maltese artist (d. 2018)
 23 May – Vladimír Preclík, Czech writer and sculptor (d. 2008)
 31 May – Nicholas Krushenick, American pop art painter (d. 1999)
 4 June – Davidee Itulu, Inuit artist (d. 2006)

July to December
 13 July – René Laloux, French animator and film director (d. 2004)
 25 July – Bryan Pearce, English naïve painter (d. 2007)
 29 July – Jean Baudrillard, French cultural theorist, sociologist, philosopher, political commentator and photographer (d. 2007)
 8 August – Josef Mikl, Austrian abstract painter (d. 2008)
 4 September – Anne Dunn, painter
 21 September – Edgar Valter, Estonian writer and illustrator of children's books (d. 2006)
 4 November — Jane Davis Doggett, graphic designer

Undated
 Barrie Cook, English abstract painter (d. 2020)
 Li Yuan-chia, Chinese-born artist, poet and curator (d. 1994)

Deaths
 January 12 – Arthur Diehl, English landscape painter (b. 1870)
 January 13 – Emil Fuchs, Austrian American sculptor and painter (b. 1866)
 January 18 – Maurice Bouchor, French poet and sculptor (b. 1855)
 February 14 – Sydney Carline, English painter, war artist (b. 1888)
 February 22 – Louise Upton Brumback, American landscape painter (b. 1867)
 March 1
 Vincenzo Gemito, Italian sculptor (b. 1852)
 Ernst Oppler, German painter (b. 1867)
 March 5 – Francesco Paolo Michetti, Italian painter (b. 1851)
 April 22 – Henry Lerolle, painter and arts patron (b. 1848)
 May 5 – Charles Grafly, sculptor (b. 1862)
 May 9 – Kate Dickens Perugini, English painter (b. 1839)
 June 13 – Margaret Forrest, art collector (b. 1844)
 July 3 – Pascal Dagnan-Bouveret, painter (b. 1852)
 July 12 – Robert Henri, painter, leader of the Ash Can School (b. 1865)
 July 28 – Allen Hutchinson, sculptor (b. 1855)
 August 9 – Heinrich Zille, photographer and illustrator (b. 1858)
 October 1 – Antoine Bourdelle, sculptor (b. 1861)
 October 26 – Aby Warburg, German art historian (b. 1866)
 date unknown - Adelaïde Alsop Robineau, American painter and potter (b. 1865)

See also
 1929 in fine arts of the Soviet Union

References

 
Years of the 20th century in art
1920s in art